Cistella is a genus of fungi within the Hyaloscyphaceae family. The genus contains 38 species.

References

External links
Cistella at Index Fungorum

Hyaloscyphaceae